Alexander Ruuttu (born December 9, 1992) is an American born Finnish professional ice hockey forward. He is currently playing for Ässät in the Finnish Liiga. Ruuttu was selected by the Phoenix Coyotes in the 2nd round (51st overall) of the 2011 NHL Entry Draft. Ruuttu was part of KalPA's Spengler Cup Championship winning team in 2018.

His father is the former National Hockey League player, Christian Ruuttu.

Career statistics

Regular season and playoffs

References

External links

1992 births
Ilves players
Jokerit players
Living people
Ice hockey people from Chicago
Arizona Coyotes draft picks
American people of Finnish descent
Finnish ice hockey right wingers